Raquel González Campos (born 16 November 1989) is an Olympic athlete from Spain and represents Futbol Club Barcelona. She competed in the Women's 20 kilometres walk event at the Olympic Games in Rio de Janeiro (Brazil) 2016 and 2015 World Championships in Athletics in Beijing, China  and World Championship 2019 in Doha, Qatar. She's bronze medal in European Cup 20km racewalker, Alytus 2019 and Top 8 World Ranking 50km racewalker, 2019.

Competition record

See also
 Spain at the 2015 World Championships in Athletics
Spanish Record Holder 10km racewalker 42:14 
Spanish Record Holder 50km racewalker 4:11:01
Spain Bronze Medal Team at the World Racewalking Cup, Taicang (China) 2018
Bronze Medal European Cup 20km racewalker, Alytus 2019

References

External links
 
 
 
 
 

1989 births
Living people
Athletes from Catalonia
Spanish female racewalkers
People from Mataró
Sportspeople from the Province of Barcelona
World Athletics Championships athletes for Spain
Athletes (track and field) at the 2016 Summer Olympics
Athletes (track and field) at the 2020 Summer Olympics
Olympic athletes of Spain
Athletes (track and field) at the 2013 Mediterranean Games
Mediterranean Games competitors for Spain
European Athletics Championships medalists
21st-century Spanish women